The first USS Meade (DD-274) was a  in the United States Navy and transferred to the Royal Navy as HMS Ramsey (G60).

Service history

As USS Meade
Named for brothers Richard Worsam Meade and Robert Leamy Meade, she was laid down by Bethlehem Shipbuilding Corporation, Squantum, Massachusetts, on 23 September 1918; launched on 24 May 1919; sponsored by Miss Annie Paulding Meade; and commissioned at Boston, Massachusetts, on 8 September 1919.

After shakedown along the east coast, Meade was assigned to duty with the Pacific Fleet. For more than two years afterward, she operated out of west coast ports including San Diego, California and San Francisco, California while participating in fleet and squadron maneuvers. After duty with several destroyer divisions, she decommissioned at San Diego on 25 May 1922 and was placed in reserve.

Meade recommissioned at San Diego on 18 December 1939. After returning to the east coast in 1940, she served with ships of Destroyer Squadron 9 (DesRon 9) of the United States Fleet.

As HMS Ramsey
In accordance with provisions of the Destroyers for Bases Agreement of September 1940, Meade was designated one of the 50 destroyers to be transferred to Britain. She was decommissioned from the USN and turned over to the British on 26 November 1940. Renamed HMS Ramsey (G60), she served the Royal Navy in the North Atlantic and later performed duty as an aircraft training ship. She completed her service on 30 June 1945 and was scrapped in July 1947 at Bo'ness, Scotland.

References

External links
Photo gallery at navsource.org
Photo gallery at Naval Historical Center

 

Clemson-class destroyers
Ships built in Quincy, Massachusetts
1919 ships
Ships transferred from the United States Navy to the Royal Navy
Town-class destroyers of the Royal Navy
Town-class destroyers converted from Clemson-class destroyers
World War II destroyers of the United Kingdom